Emerald Empire Hempfest is a cannabis festival in Eugene, Oregon, in the United States.

The festival has been held on the third weekend in July since 2003. The event is free at attend.

In 2016, the festival's executive director, Dan Koozer, filed a petition in Lane County Circuit Court after being denied permission to host the event at Maurie Jacobs Park.

References

External links

 

2003 establishments in Oregon
Annual events in Eugene, Oregon
Cannabis events in the United States
Cannabis in Oregon
Recurring events established in 2003
Summer events in the United States